Bolma johnstoni is a species of sea snail, a marine gastropod mollusk in the family Turbinidae, the turban snails.

Description
The shell grows to a length of 37 mm

Distribution
This species occurs in the Atlantic Ocean off Sierra Leone and Angola.

References

 Odhner, N.H. (1923) Contribution to the marine molluscan faunas of South and West Africa. Meddelanden fran Göteborgs Musei Zoologiska Avdelning, 23, 1–39, 1 pl.
 Nolf F. 2005. A new species of Bolma (Gastropoda: Turbinoidea: Turbinidae) from Angola. Neptunea 4 (5) : 1–7
 Gofas, S.; Afonso, J.P.; Brandào, M. (Ed.). (S.a.). Conchas e Moluscos de Angola = Coquillages et Mollusques d'Angola. [Shells and molluscs of Angola]. Universidade Agostinho / Elf Aquitaine Angola: Angola. 140 pp.

johnstoni
Gastropods described in 1923